SS Empire Shelter was a convoy rescue ship built for the Royal Navy during World War II, originally laid down as the  HMS Barnard Castle (pennant number K594). Completed a month before the end of the war in May 1945, she made a few short voyages before she was reduced to reserve. The ship later served as a barracks ship and then as a troopship before she was sold for scrap in 1955.

Design and description
The Castle-class corvette was a stretched version of the preceding Flower class, enlarged to improve seakeeping and to accommodate modern weapons. The ships were powered by a pair of triple-expansion steam engines, each driving one propeller shaft using steam provided by two Admiralty three-drum boilers. The convoy rescue ships were given an armament of a single 12-pounder anti-aircraft (AA) guns and five  Oerlikon AA guns on single mounts.

Construction and career
The ship was ordered from George Brown & Co. of Greenock on 9 December 1942 as a Castle-class corvette. She was laid down in 1943 and launched on 5 October 1944 as Barnard Castle (K594), but further work was then cancelled, and she was completed as a convoy rescue ship on 17 April 1945. Under the ownership of the Ministry of War Transport, and managed by the Ellerman City Line, she sailed on six convoys over the next month, but made no rescues. On 22 May 1945 the ship was briefly placed in reserve before she became an accommodation ship for the Third Submarine Flotilla based in Holy Loch. Empire Shelter later served as a troopship. By 1955 she had been laid up in the River Fal and was sold for scrap that year. The ship arrived at Burght, Belgium, on 29 July to begin demolition.

References

Bibliography

 
 

Empire ships
Castle-class corvettes
1944 ships
Ships built on the River Clyde